Andrés Sapelak, S.D.B.  (December 13, 1919 – November 6, 2017) was an Argentinian hierarch of the Ukrainian Greek Catholic Church. At the time of his death he was the oldest bishop in this Eastern Catholic Church.

Biography
Sapelak was born in Ryszkowa Wola, Second Polish Republic, in the Ukrainian family of Mykhaylo and Ahafiya (née Yarosh) Sapelak and ordained a priest on June 29, 1949, joining the religious order of Salesians of Saint John Bosco. He was appointed Auxiliary bishop of Faithful of the Oriental Rites (Argentina) as well as Titular Bishop of Sebastopolis on August 14, 1961, and consecrated on October 15, 1961. On February 9, 1968, Sapelak was appointed bishop of Eparchy of Santa María del Patrocinio en Buenos Aires where he remained until his retirement on December 12, 1997.

Sapelak then returned to Ukraine and worked as parish priest in Verkhnodniprovsk city in the Ukrainian Catholic Archiepiscopal Exarchate of Donetsk – Kharkiv from 1999 until 2014. In November 2013, he received Ukrainian citizenship. On November 6, 2017, he died in the Salesian house in Vynnyky near Lviv, where he resided from 2014.

References

External links
 Catholic-Hierarchy

1919 births
2017 deaths
People from Jarosław County
Argentine bishops
Ukrainian bishops
20th-century Eastern Catholic bishops
21st-century Eastern Catholic bishops
Salesian bishops
Salesians of Don Bosco
Participants in the Second Vatican Council
Bishops of the Ukrainian Greek Catholic Church
Naturalized citizens of Ukraine
Ukrainian emigrants to Argentina